Ewelina Weronika Brzezińska (born Ewelina Sieczka, 26 January 1988 in Sosnowiec) is a Polish volleyball player, a member of Poland women's national volleyball team.

She participated in the  2013 FIVB World Grand Prix.

From the 2017/2018 season, she plays for the Trefl Proxima Kraków team [1].

Clubs 
  Polska MKS Dąbrowa Górnicza
 2010-2012 Atom Trefl Sopot
 2012-2013  BKS Aluprof Bielsko-Biała
 2013-2014  Impel Wrocław
 2014-2016  Budowlani Łódź
 2016-2017  BKS Profi Credit Bielsko-Biała
 2017-2018	 Trefl Proxima Kraków

References

External links 
 Ewelina Weronika Brzezinska at the International Volleyball Federation
 
 

1988 births
Living people
Polish women's volleyball players
People from Sosnowiec
Universiade bronze medalists for Poland
Universiade medalists in volleyball